Achille Fraschini (born April 7, 1936, in Casalpusterlengo, Province of Lodi) was an Italian former footballer who played as a midfielder. He made nearly 500 appearances in the Italian professional leagues and scored 104 goals.

Honours
 Coppa Italia winner: 1961–62

References

1936 births
Living people
People from Casalpusterlengo
Italian footballers
Association football midfielders
Brescia Calcio players
Inter Milan players
A.C. Monza players
A.C.R. Messina players
S.S.C. Napoli players
L.R. Vicenza players
Calcio Padova players
Serie A players
Serie B players
Footballers from Lombardy
Sportspeople from the Province of Lodi